This is the list of the 802 isomers of tridecane, with their IUPAC names.

Straight Chain
 Tridecane

With dodecane backbone
 2-Methyldodecane
 3-Methyldodecane
 4-Methyldodecane
 5-Methyldodecane
 6-Methyldodecane

With undecane backbone

Dimethyl

 2,2-Dimethylundecane
 2,3-Dimethylundecane
 2,4-Dimethylundecane
 2,5-Dimethylundecane
 2,6-Dimethylundecane
 2,7-Dimethylundecane
 2,8-Dimethylundecane
 2,9-Dimethylundecane
 2,10-Dimethylundecane
 3,3-Dimethylundecane
 3,4-Dimethylundecane
 3,5-Dimethylundecane
 3,6-Dimethylundecane
 3,7-Dimethylundecane
 3,8-Dimethylundecane
 3,9-Dimethylundecane
 4,4-Dimethylundecane
 4,5-Dimethylundecane
 4,6-Dimethylundecane
 4,7-Dimethylundecane
 4,8-Dimethylundecane
 5,5-Dimethylundecane
 5,6-Dimethylundecane
 5,7-Dimethylundecane
 6,6-Dimethylundecane

Ethyl
 3-Ethylundecane
 4-Ethylundecane
 5-Ethylundecane
 6-Ethylundecane

With decane backbone

Trimethyl

 2,2,3-Trimethyldecane
 2,2,4-Trimethyldecane
 2,2,5-Trimethyldecane
 2,2,6-Trimethyldecane
 2,2,7-Trimethyldecane
 2,2,8-Trimethyldecane
 2,2,9-Trimethyldecane
 2,3,3-Trimethyldecane
 2,3,4-Trimethyldecane
 2,3,5-Trimethyldecane
 2,3,6-Trimethyldecane
 2,3,7-Trimethyldecane
 2,3,8-Trimethyldecane
 2,3,9-Trimethyldecane
 2,4,4-Trimethyldecane
 2,4,5-Trimethyldecane
 2,4,6-Trimethyldecane
 2,4,7-Trimethyldecane
 2,4,8-Trimethyldecane
 2,4,9-Trimethyldecane
 2,5,5-Trimethyldecane
 2,5,6-Trimethyldecane
 2,5,7-Trimethyldecane
 2,5,8-Trimethyldecane
 2,5,9-Trimethyldecane
 2,6,6-Trimethyldecane
 2,6,7-Trimethyldecane
 2,6,8-Trimethyldecane
 2,7,7-Trimethyldecane
 2,7,8-Trimethyldecane
 2,8,8-Trimethyldecane
 3,3,4-Trimethyldecane
 3,3,5-Trimethyldecane
 3,3,6-Trimethyldecane
 3,3,7-Trimethyldecane
 3,3,8-Trimethyldecane
 3,4,4-Trimethyldecane
 3,4,5-Trimethyldecane
 3,4,6-Trimethyldecane
 3,4,7-Trimethyldecane
 3,4,8-Trimethyldecane
 3,5,5-Trimethyldecane
 3,5,6-Trimethyldecane
 3,5,7-Trimethyldecane
 3,5,8-Trimethyldecane
 3,6,6-Trimethyldecane
 3,6,7-Trimethyldecane
 3,7,7-Trimethyldecane
 4,4,5-Trimethyldecane
 4,4,6-Trimethyldecane
 4,4,7-Trimethyldecane
 4,5,5-Trimethyldecane
 4,5,6-Trimethyldecane
 4,5,7-Trimethyldecane
 4,6,6-Trimethyldecane
 5,5,6-Trimethyldecane

Ethyl+Methyl

 3-Ethyl-2-methyldecane
 3-Ethyl-3-methyldecane
 3-Ethyl-4-methyldecane
 3-Ethyl-5-methyldecane
 3-Ethyl-6-methyldecane
 3-Ethyl-7-methyldecane
 3-Ethyl-8-methyldecane
 4-Ethyl-2-methyldecane
 4-Ethyl-3-methyldecane
 4-Ethyl-4-methyldecane
 4-Ethyl-5-methyldecane
 4-Ethyl-6-methyldecane
 4-Ethyl-7-methyldecane
 5-Ethyl-2-methyldecane
 5-Ethyl-3-methyldecane
 5-Ethyl-4-methyldecane
 5-Ethyl-5-methyldecane
 5-Ethyl-6-methyldecane
 6-Ethyl-2-methyldecane
 6-Ethyl-3-methyldecane
 6-Ethyl-4-methyldecane
 7-Ethyl-2-methyldecane
 7-Ethyl-3-methyldecane
 8-Ethyl-2-methyldecane

Propyl
 4-Propyldecane
 5-Propyldecane
 4-(1-Methylethyl)decane
 5-(1-Methylethyl)decane

With nonane backbone

Tetramethyl

 2,2,3,3-Tetramethylnonane
 2,2,3,4-Tetramethylnonane
 2,2,3,5-Tetramethylnonane
 2,2,3,6-Tetramethylnonane
 2,2,3,7-Tetramethylnonane
 2,2,3,8-Tetramethylnonane
 2,2,4,4-Tetramethylnonane
 2,2,4,5-Tetramethylnonane
 2,2,4,6-Tetramethylnonane
 2,2,4,7-Tetramethylnonane
 2,2,4,8-Tetramethylnonane
 2,2,5,5-Tetramethylnonane
 2,2,5,6-Tetramethylnonane
 2,2,5,7-Tetramethylnonane
 2,2,5,8-Tetramethylnonane
 2,2,6,6-Tetramethylnonane
 2,2,6,7-Tetramethylnonane
 2,2,6,8-Tetramethylnonane
 2,2,7,7-Tetramethylnonane
 2,2,7,8-Tetramethylnonane
 2,2,8,8-Tetramethylnonane
 2,3,3,4-Tetramethylnonane
 2,3,3,5-Tetramethylnonane
 2,3,3,6-Tetramethylnonane
 2,3,3,7-Tetramethylnonane
 2,3,3,8-Tetramethylnonane
 2,3,4,4-Tetramethylnonane
 2,3,4,5-Tetramethylnonane
 2,3,4,6-Tetramethylnonane
 2,3,4,7-Tetramethylnonane
 2,3,4,8-Tetramethylnonane
 2,3,5,5-Tetramethylnonane
 2,3,5,6-Tetramethylnonane
 2,3,5,7-Tetramethylnonane
 2,3,5,8-Tetramethylnonane
 2,3,6,6-Tetramethylnonane
 2,3,6,7-Tetramethylnonane
 2,3,6,8-Tetramethylnonane
 2,3,7,7-Tetramethylnonane
 2,3,7,8-Tetramethylnonane
 2,4,4,5-Tetramethylnonane
 2,4,4,6-Tetramethylnonane
 2,4,4,7-Tetramethylnonane
 2,4,4,8-Tetramethylnonane
 2,4,5,5-Tetramethylnonane
 2,4,5,6-Tetramethylnonane
 2,4,5,7-Tetramethylnonane
 2,4,5,8-Tetramethylnonane
 2,4,6,6-Tetramethylnonane
 2,4,6,7-Tetramethylnonane
 2,4,6,8-Tetramethylnonane
 2,4,7,7-Tetramethylnonane
 2,5,5,6-Tetramethylnonane
 2,5,5,7-Tetramethylnonane
 2,5,5,8-Tetramethylnonane
 2,5,6,6-Tetramethylnonane
 2,5,6,7-Tetramethylnonane
 2,5,7,7-Tetramethylnonane
 2,6,6,7-Tetramethylnonane
 2,6,7,7-Tetramethylnonane
 3,3,4,4-Tetramethylnonane
 3,3,4,5-Tetramethylnonane
 3,3,4,6-Tetramethylnonane
 3,3,4,7-Tetramethylnonane
 3,3,5,5-Tetramethylnonane
 3,3,5,6-Tetramethylnonane
 3,3,5,7-Tetramethylnonane
 3,3,6,6-Tetramethylnonane
 3,3,6,7-Tetramethylnonane
 3,3,7,7-Tetramethylnonane
 3,4,4,5-Tetramethylnonane
 3,4,4,6-Tetramethylnonane
 3,4,4,7-Tetramethylnonane
 3,4,5,5-Tetramethylnonane
 3,4,5,6-Tetramethylnonane
 3,4,5,7-Tetramethylnonane
 3,4,6,6-Tetramethylnonane
 3,4,6,7-Tetramethylnonane
 3,5,5,6-Tetramethylnonane
 3,5,5,7-Tetramethylnonane
 3,5,6,6-Tetramethylnonane
 4,4,5,5-Tetramethylnonane
 4,4,5,6-Tetramethylnonane
 4,4,6,6-Tetramethylnonane
 4,5,5,6-Tetramethylnonane

Ethyl+Dimethyl

 3-Ethyl-2,2-dimethylnonane
 3-Ethyl-2,3-dimethylnonane
 3-Ethyl-2,4-dimethylnonane
 3-Ethyl-2,5-dimethylnonane
 3-Ethyl-2,6-dimethylnonane
 3-Ethyl-2,7-dimethylnonane
 3-Ethyl-2,8-dimethylnonane
 3-Ethyl-3,4-dimethylnonane
 3-Ethyl-3,5-dimethylnonane
 3-Ethyl-3,6-dimethylnonane
 3-Ethyl-3,7-dimethylnonane
 3-Ethyl-4,4-dimethylnonane
 3-Ethyl-4,5-dimethylnonane
 3-Ethyl-4,6-dimethylnonane
 3-Ethyl-4,7-dimethylnonane
 3-Ethyl-5,5-dimethylnonane
 3-Ethyl-5,6-dimethylnonane
 3-Ethyl-5,7-dimethylnonane
 3-Ethyl-6,6-dimethylnonane
 4-Ethyl-2,2-dimethylnonane
 4-Ethyl-2,3-dimethylnonane
 4-Ethyl-2,4-dimethylnonane
 4-Ethyl-2,5-dimethylnonane
 4-Ethyl-2,6-dimethylnonane
 4-Ethyl-2,7-dimethylnonane
 4-Ethyl-2,8-dimethylnonane
 4-Ethyl-3,3-dimethylnonane
 4-Ethyl-3,4-dimethylnonane
 4-Ethyl-3,5-dimethylnonane
 4-Ethyl-3,6-dimethylnonane
 4-Ethyl-3,7-dimethylnonane
 4-Ethyl-4,5-dimethylnonane
 4-Ethyl-4,6-dimethylnonane
 4-Ethyl-5,5-dimethylnonane
 4-Ethyl-5,6-dimethylnonane
 5-Ethyl-2,2-dimethylnonane
 5-Ethyl-2,3-dimethylnonane
 5-Ethyl-2,4-dimethylnonane
 5-Ethyl-2,5-dimethylnonane
 5-Ethyl-2,6-dimethylnonane
 5-Ethyl-2,7-dimethylnonane
 5-Ethyl-2,8-dimethylnonane
 5-Ethyl-3,3-dimethylnonane
 5-Ethyl-3,4-dimethylnonane
 5-Ethyl-3,5-dimethylnonane
 5-Ethyl-3,6-dimethylnonane
 5-Ethyl-3,7-dimethylnonane
 5-Ethyl-4,4-dimethylnonane
 5-Ethyl-4,5-dimethylnonane
 5-Ethyl-4,6-dimethylnonane
 6-Ethyl-2,2-dimethylnonane
 6-Ethyl-2,3-dimethylnonane
 6-Ethyl-2,4-dimethylnonane
 6-Ethyl-2,5-dimethylnonane
 6-Ethyl-2,6-dimethylnonane
 6-Ethyl-2,7-dimethylnonane
 6-Ethyl-3,3-dimethylnonane
 6-Ethyl-3,4-dimethylnonane
 6-Ethyl-3,5-dimethylnonane
 6-Ethyl-3,6-dimethylnonane
 6-Ethyl-4,4-dimethylnonane
 7-Ethyl-2,2-dimethylnonane
 7-Ethyl-2,3-dimethylnonane
 7-Ethyl-2,4-dimethylnonane
 7-Ethyl-2,5-dimethylnonane
 7-Ethyl-2,6-dimethylnonane
 7-Ethyl-2,7-dimethylnonane
 7-Ethyl-3,3-dimethylnonane
 7-Ethyl-3,4-dimethylnonane

Diethyl

 3,3-Diethylnonane
 3,4-Diethylnonane
 3,5-Diethylnonane
 3,6-Diethylnonane
 3,7-Diethylnonane
 4,4-Diethylnonane
 4,5-Diethylnonane
 4,6-Diethylnonane
 5,5-Diethylnonane

Methyl+Propyl

 2-Methyl-4-propylnonane
 3-Methyl-4-propylnonane
 4-Methyl-4-propylnonane
 5-Methyl-4-propylnonane
 6-Methyl-4-propylnonane
 2-Methyl-5-propylnonane
 3-Methyl-5-propylnonane
 4-Methyl-5-propylnonane
 5-Methyl-5-propylnonane
 2-Methyl-6-propylnonane
 3-Methyl-6-propylnonane
 2-Methyl-3-(1-methylethyl)nonane
 2-Methyl-4-(1-methylethyl)nonane
 3-Methyl-4-(1-methylethyl)nonane
 4-Methyl-4-(1-methylethyl)nonane
 5-Methyl-4-(1-methylethyl)nonane
 6-Methyl-4-(1-methylethyl)nonane
 2-Methyl-5-(1-methylethyl)nonane
 3-Methyl-5-(1-methylethyl)nonane
 4-Methyl-5-(1-methylethyl)nonane
 5-Methyl-5-(1-methylethyl)nonane
 2-Methyl-6-(1-methylethyl)nonane
 3-Methyl-6-(1-methylethyl)nonane

Butyl
 5-Butylnonane
 5-(1-Methylpropyl)nonane (or 5-sec-Butylnonane)
 5-(2-Methylpropyl)nonane (or 5-Isobutylnonane)
 4-(1,1-Dimethylethyl)nonane (or 4-tert-Butylnonane)
 5-(1,1-Dimethylethyl)nonane (or 5-tert-Butylnonane)

With octane backbone

Pentamethyl

 2,2,3,3,4-Pentamethyloctane
 2,2,3,3,5-Pentamethyloctane
 2,2,3,3,6-Pentamethyloctane
 2,2,3,3,7-Pentamethyloctane
 2,2,3,4,4-Pentamethyloctane
 2,2,3,4,5-Pentamethyloctane
 2,2,3,4,6-Pentamethyloctane
 2,2,3,4,7-Pentamethyloctane
 2,2,3,5,5-Pentamethyloctane
 2,2,3,5,6-Pentamethyloctane
 2,2,3,5,7-Pentamethyloctane
 2,2,3,6,6-Pentamethyloctane
 2,2,3,6,7-Pentamethyloctane
 2,2,3,7,7-Pentamethyloctane
 2,2,4,4,5-Pentamethyloctane
 2,2,4,4,6-Pentamethyloctane
 2,2,4,4,7-Pentamethyloctane
 2,2,4,5,5-Pentamethyloctane
 2,2,4,5,6-Pentamethyloctane
 2,2,4,5,7-Pentamethyloctane
 2,2,4,6,6-Pentamethyloctane
 2,2,4,6,7-Pentamethyloctane
 2,2,4,7,7-Pentamethyloctane
 2,2,5,5,6-Pentamethyloctane
 2,2,5,5,7-Pentamethyloctane
 2,2,5,6,6-Pentamethyloctane
 2,2,5,6,7-Pentamethyloctane
 2,2,6,6,7-Pentamethyloctane
 2,3,3,4,4-Pentamethyloctane
 2,3,3,4,5-Pentamethyloctane
 2,3,3,4,6-Pentamethyloctane
 2,3,3,4,7-Pentamethyloctane
 2,3,3,5,5-Pentamethyloctane
 2,3,3,5,6-Pentamethyloctane
 2,3,3,5,7-Pentamethyloctane
 2,3,3,6,6-Pentamethyloctane
 2,3,3,6,7-Pentamethyloctane
 2,3,4,4,5-Pentamethyloctane
 2,3,4,4,6-Pentamethyloctane
 2,3,4,4,7-Pentamethyloctane
 2,3,4,5,5-Pentamethyloctane
 2,3,4,5,6-Pentamethyloctane
 2,3,4,5,7-Pentamethyloctane
 2,3,4,6,6-Pentamethyloctane
 2,3,4,6,7-Pentamethyloctane
 2,3,5,5,6-Pentamethyloctane
 2,3,5,5,7-Pentamethyloctane
 2,3,5,6,6-Pentamethyloctane
 2,4,4,5,5-Pentamethyloctane
 2,4,4,5,6-Pentamethyloctane
 2,4,4,5,7-Pentamethyloctane
 2,4,4,6,6-Pentamethyloctane
 2,4,5,5,6-Pentamethyloctane
 2,4,5,6,6-Pentamethyloctane
 2,5,5,6,6-Pentamethyloctane
 3,3,4,4,5-Pentamethyloctane
 3,3,4,4,6-Pentamethyloctane
 3,3,4,5,5-Pentamethyloctane
 3,3,4,5,6-Pentamethyloctane
 3,3,4,6,6-Pentamethyloctane
 3,3,5,5,6-Pentamethyloctane
 3,4,4,5,5-Pentamethyloctane
 3,4,4,5,6-Pentamethyloctane

Ethyl+Trimethyl

 3-Ethyl-2,2,3-trimethyloctane
 3-Ethyl-2,2,4-trimethyloctane
 3-Ethyl-2,2,5-trimethyloctane
 3-Ethyl-2,2,6-trimethyloctane
 3-Ethyl-2,2,7-trimethyloctane
 3-Ethyl-2,3,4-trimethyloctane
 3-Ethyl-2,3,5-trimethyloctane
 3-Ethyl-2,3,6-trimethyloctane
 3-Ethyl-2,3,7-trimethyloctane
 3-Ethyl-2,4,4-trimethyloctane
 3-Ethyl-2,4,5-trimethyloctane
 3-Ethyl-2,4,6-trimethyloctane
 3-Ethyl-2,4,7-trimethyloctane
 3-Ethyl-2,5,5-trimethyloctane
 3-Ethyl-2,5,6-trimethyloctane
 3-Ethyl-2,5,7-trimethyloctane
 3-Ethyl-2,6,6-trimethyloctane
 3-Ethyl-2,6,7-trimethyloctane
 3-Ethyl-3,4,4-trimethyloctane
 3-Ethyl-3,4,5-trimethyloctane
 3-Ethyl-3,4,6-trimethyloctane
 3-Ethyl-3,5,5-trimethyloctane
 3-Ethyl-3,5,6-trimethyloctane
 3-Ethyl-3,6,6-trimethyloctane
 3-Ethyl-4,4,5-trimethyloctane
 3-Ethyl-4,4,6-trimethyloctane
 3-Ethyl-4,5,5-trimethyloctane
 3-Ethyl-4,5,6-trimethyloctane
 4-Ethyl-2,2,3-trimethyloctane
 4-Ethyl-2,2,4-trimethyloctane
 4-Ethyl-2,2,5-trimethyloctane
 4-Ethyl-2,2,6-trimethyloctane
 4-Ethyl-2,2,7-trimethyloctane
 4-Ethyl-2,3,3-trimethyloctane
 4-Ethyl-2,3,4-trimethyloctane
 4-Ethyl-2,3,5-trimethyloctane
 4-Ethyl-2,3,6-trimethyloctane
 4-Ethyl-2,3,7-trimethyloctane
 4-Ethyl-2,4,5-trimethyloctane
 4-Ethyl-2,4,6-trimethyloctane
 4-Ethyl-2,4,7-trimethyloctane
 4-Ethyl-2,5,5-trimethyloctane
 4-Ethyl-2,5,6-trimethyloctane
 4-Ethyl-2,5,7-trimethyloctane
 4-Ethyl-2,6,6-trimethyloctane
 4-Ethyl-3,3,4-trimethyloctane
 4-Ethyl-3,3,5-trimethyloctane
 4-Ethyl-3,3,6-trimethyloctane
 4-Ethyl-3,4,5-trimethyloctane
 4-Ethyl-3,4,6-trimethyloctane
 4-Ethyl-3,5,5-trimethyloctane
 4-Ethyl-3,5,6-trimethyloctane
 4-Ethyl-4,5,5-trimethyloctane
 5-Ethyl-2,2,3-trimethyloctane
 5-Ethyl-2,2,4-trimethyloctane
 5-Ethyl-2,2,5-trimethyloctane
 5-Ethyl-2,2,6-trimethyloctane
 5-Ethyl-2,2,7-trimethyloctane
 5-Ethyl-2,3,3-trimethyloctane
 5-Ethyl-2,3,4-trimethyloctane
 5-Ethyl-2,3,5-trimethyloctane
 5-Ethyl-2,3,6-trimethyloctane
 5-Ethyl-2,3,7-trimethyloctane
 5-Ethyl-2,4,4-trimethyloctane
 5-Ethyl-2,4,5-trimethyloctane
 5-Ethyl-2,4,6-trimethyloctane
 5-Ethyl-2,5,6-trimethyloctane
 5-Ethyl-2,6,6-trimethyloctane
 5-Ethyl-3,3,4-trimethyloctane
 5-Ethyl-3,3,5-trimethyloctane
 5-Ethyl-3,3,6-trimethyloctane
 5-Ethyl-3,4,4-trimethyloctane
 5-Ethyl-3,4,5-trimethyloctane
 6-Ethyl-2,2,3-trimethyloctane
 6-Ethyl-2,2,4-trimethyloctane
 6-Ethyl-2,2,5-trimethyloctane
 6-Ethyl-2,2,6-trimethyloctane
 6-Ethyl-2,2,7-trimethyloctane
 6-Ethyl-2,3,3-trimethyloctane
 6-Ethyl-2,3,4-trimethyloctane
 6-Ethyl-2,3,5-trimethyloctane
 6-Ethyl-2,3,6-trimethyloctane
 6-Ethyl-2,4,4-trimethyloctane
 6-Ethyl-2,4,5-trimethyloctane
 6-Ethyl-2,4,6-trimethyloctane
 6-Ethyl-2,5,5-trimethyloctane
 6-Ethyl-2,5,6-trimethyloctane
 6-Ethyl-3,3,4-trimethyloctane
 6-Ethyl-3,3,5-trimethyloctane
 6-Ethyl-3,4,4-trimethyloctane

Diethyl+Methyl

 3,3-Diethyl-2-methyloctane
 3,3-Diethyl-4-methyloctane
 3,3-Diethyl-5-methyloctane
 3,3-Diethyl-6-methyloctane
 3,4-Diethyl-2-methyloctane
 3,4-Diethyl-3-methyloctane
 3,4-Diethyl-4-methyloctane
 3,4-Diethyl-5-methyloctane
 3,4-Diethyl-6-methyloctane
 3,5-Diethyl-2-methyloctane
 3,5-Diethyl-3-methyloctane
 3,5-Diethyl-4-methyloctane
 3,5-Diethyl-5-methyloctane
 3,6-Diethyl-2-methyloctane
 3,6-Diethyl-3-methyloctane
 3,6-Diethyl-4-methyloctane
 4,4-Diethyl-2-methyloctane
 4,4-Diethyl-3-methyloctane
 4,4-Diethyl-5-methyloctane
 4,5-Diethyl-2-methyloctane
 4,5-Diethyl-3-methyloctane
 4,5-Diethyl-4-methyloctane
 4,6-Diethyl-2-methyloctane
 4,6-Diethyl-3-methyloctane
 5,5-Diethyl-2-methyloctane
 5,5-Diethyl-3-methyloctane
 5,6-Diethyl-2-methyloctane
 6,6-Diethyl-2-methyloctane

Dimethyl+Propyl

 2,2-Dimethyl-4-propyloctane
 2,3-Dimethyl-4-propyloctane
 2,4-Dimethyl-4-propyloctane
 2,5-Dimethyl-4-propyloctane
 2,6-Dimethyl-4-propyloctane
 2,7-Dimethyl-4-propyloctane
 3,3-Dimethyl-4-propyloctane
 3,4-Dimethyl-4-propyloctane
 3,5-Dimethyl-4-propyloctane
 3,6-Dimethyl-4-propyloctane
 4,5-Dimethyl-4-propyloctane
 2,2-Dimethyl-5-propyloctane
 2,3-Dimethyl-5-propyloctane
 2,4-Dimethyl-5-propyloctane
 2,5-Dimethyl-5-propyloctane
 2,6-Dimethyl-5-propyloctane
 3,3-Dimethyl-5-propyloctane
 3,4-Dimethyl-5-propyloctane
 3,5-Dimethyl-5-propyloctane
 4,4-Dimethyl-5-propyloctane
 2,2-Dimethyl-3-(1-methylethyl)octane
 2,3-Dimethyl-3-(1-methylethyl)octane
 2,4-Dimethyl-3-(1-methylethyl)octane
 2,5-Dimethyl-3-(1-methylethyl)octane
 2,6-Dimethyl-3-(1-methylethyl)octane
 2,7-Dimethyl-3-(1-methylethyl)octane
 2,2-Dimethyl-4-(1-methylethyl)octane
 2,3-Dimethyl-4-(1-methylethyl)octane
 2,4-Dimethyl-4-(1-methylethyl)octane
 2,5-Dimethyl-4-(1-methylethyl)octane
 2,6-Dimethyl-4-(1-methylethyl)octane
 2,7-Dimethyl-4-(1-methylethyl)octane
 3,3-Dimethyl-4-(1-methylethyl)octane
 3,4-Dimethyl-4-(1-methylethyl)octane
 3,5-Dimethyl-4-(1-methylethyl)octane
 3,6-Dimethyl-4-(1-methylethyl)octane
 4,5-Dimethyl-4-(1-methylethyl)octane
 2,2-Dimethyl-5-(1-methylethyl)octane
 2,3-Dimethyl-5-(1-methylethyl)octane
 2,4-Dimethyl-5-(1-methylethyl)octane
 2,5-Dimethyl-5-(1-methylethyl)octane
 2,6-Dimethyl-5-(1-methylethyl)octane
 3,3-Dimethyl-5-(1-methylethyl)octane
 3,4-Dimethyl-5-(1-methylethyl)octane
 3,5-Dimethyl-5-(1-methylethyl)octane
 4,4-Dimethyl-5-(1-methylethyl)octane

Ethyl+Propyl

 3-Ethyl-4-propyloctane
 4-Ethyl-4-propyloctane
 4-Ethyl-5-propyloctane
 3-Ethyl-5-propyloctane
 3-Ethyl-4-(1-methylethyl)octane
 4-Ethyl-4-(1-methylethyl)octane
 4-Ethyl-5-(1-methylethyl)octane
 3-Ethyl-5-(1-methylethyl)octane

Butyl+Methyl

 2-Methyl-4-(1-methylpropyl)octane
 3-Methyl-4-(1-methylpropyl)octane
 2-Methyl-4-(2-methylpropyl)octane
 4-(1,1-Dimethylethyl)-2-methyloctane
 4-(1,1-Dimethylethyl)-3-methyloctane
 4-(1,1-Dimethylethyl)-4-methyloctane
 4-(1,1-Dimethylethyl)-5-methyloctane
 5-(1,1-Dimethylethyl)-2-methyloctane
 5-(1,1-Dimethylethyl)-3-methyloctane

With heptane backbone

Hexamethyl

 2,2,3,3,4,4-Hexamethylheptane
 2,2,3,3,4,5-Hexamethylheptane
 2,2,3,3,4,6-Hexamethylheptane
 2,2,3,3,5,5-Hexamethylheptane
 2,2,3,3,5,6-Hexamethylheptane
 2,2,3,3,6,6-Hexamethylheptane
 2,2,3,4,4,5-Hexamethylheptane
 2,2,3,4,4,6-Hexamethylheptane
 2,2,3,4,5,5-Hexamethylheptane
 2,2,3,4,5,6-Hexamethylheptane
 2,2,3,4,6,6-Hexamethylheptane
 2,2,3,5,5,6-Hexamethylheptane
 2,2,3,5,6,6-Hexamethylheptane
 2,2,4,4,5,5-Hexamethylheptane
 2,2,4,4,5,6-Hexamethylheptane
 2,2,4,4,6,6-Hexamethylheptane
 2,2,4,5,5,6-Hexamethylheptane
 2,3,3,4,4,5-Hexamethylheptane
 2,3,3,4,4,6-Hexamethylheptane
 2,3,3,4,5,5-Hexamethylheptane
 2,3,3,4,5,6-Hexamethylheptane
 2,3,3,5,5,6-Hexamethylheptane
 2,3,4,4,5,5-Hexamethylheptane
 2,3,4,4,5,6-Hexamethylheptane
 3,3,4,4,5,5-Hexamethylheptane

Ethyl+Tetramethyl

 3-Ethyl-2,2,3,4-tetramethylheptane
 3-Ethyl-2,2,3,5-tetramethylheptane
 3-Ethyl-2,2,3,6-tetramethylheptane
 3-Ethyl-2,2,4,4-tetramethylheptane
 3-Ethyl-2,2,4,5-tetramethylheptane
 3-Ethyl-2,2,4,6-tetramethylheptane
 3-Ethyl-2,2,5,5-tetramethylheptane
 3-Ethyl-2,2,5,6-tetramethylheptane
 3-Ethyl-2,2,6,6-tetramethylheptane
 3-Ethyl-2,3,4,4-tetramethylheptane
 3-Ethyl-2,3,4,5-tetramethylheptane
 3-Ethyl-2,3,4,6-tetramethylheptane
 3-Ethyl-2,3,5,5-tetramethylheptane
 3-Ethyl-2,3,5,6-tetramethylheptane
 3-Ethyl-2,4,4,5-tetramethylheptane
 3-Ethyl-2,4,4,6-tetramethylheptane
 3-Ethyl-2,4,5,5-tetramethylheptane
 3-Ethyl-2,4,5,6-tetramethylheptane
 3-Ethyl-3,4,4,5-tetramethylheptane
 3-Ethyl-3,4,5,5-tetramethylheptane
 4-Ethyl-2,2,3,3-tetramethylheptane
 4-Ethyl-2,2,3,4-tetramethylheptane
 4-Ethyl-2,2,3,5-tetramethylheptane
 4-Ethyl-2,2,3,6-tetramethylheptane
 4-Ethyl-2,2,4,5-tetramethylheptane
 4-Ethyl-2,2,4,6-tetramethylheptane
 4-Ethyl-2,2,5,5-tetramethylheptane
 4-Ethyl-2,2,5,6-tetramethylheptane
 4-Ethyl-2,2,6,6-tetramethylheptane
 4-Ethyl-2,3,3,4-tetramethylheptane
 4-Ethyl-2,3,3,5-tetramethylheptane
 4-Ethyl-2,3,3,6-tetramethylheptane
 4-Ethyl-2,3,4,5-tetramethylheptane
 4-Ethyl-2,3,4,6-tetramethylheptane
 4-Ethyl-2,3,5,5-tetramethylheptane
 4-Ethyl-2,3,5,6-tetramethylheptane
 4-Ethyl-2,4,5,5-tetramethylheptane
 4-Ethyl-3,3,4,5-tetramethylheptane
 4-Ethyl-3,3,5,5-tetramethylheptane
 5-Ethyl-2,2,3,3-tetramethylheptane
 5-Ethyl-2,2,3,4-tetramethylheptane
 5-Ethyl-2,2,3,5-tetramethylheptane
 5-Ethyl-2,2,3,6-tetramethylheptane
 5-Ethyl-2,2,4,4-tetramethylheptane
 5-Ethyl-2,2,4,5-tetramethylheptane
 5-Ethyl-2,2,4,6-tetramethylheptane
 5-Ethyl-2,2,5,6-tetramethylheptane
 5-Ethyl-2,3,3,4-tetramethylheptane
 5-Ethyl-2,3,3,5-tetramethylheptane
 5-Ethyl-2,3,3,6-tetramethylheptane
 5-Ethyl-2,3,4,4-tetramethylheptane
 5-Ethyl-2,3,4,5-tetramethylheptane
 5-Ethyl-2,4,4,5-tetramethylheptane
 5-Ethyl-3,3,4,4-tetramethylheptane

Diethyl+Dimethyl

 3,3-Diethyl-2,2-dimethylheptane
 3,3-Diethyl-2,4-dimethylheptane
 3,3-Diethyl-2,5-dimethylheptane
 3,3-Diethyl-2,6-dimethylheptane
 3,3-Diethyl-4,4-dimethylheptane
 3,3-Diethyl-4,5-dimethylheptane
 3,3-Diethyl-5,5-dimethylheptane
 3,4-Diethyl-2,2-dimethylheptane
 3,4-Diethyl-2,3-dimethylheptane
 3,4-Diethyl-2,4-dimethylheptane
 3,4-Diethyl-2,5-dimethylheptane
 3,4-Diethyl-2,6-dimethylheptane
 3,4-Diethyl-3,4-dimethylheptane
 3,4-Diethyl-3,5-dimethylheptane
 3,4-Diethyl-4,5-dimethylheptane
 3,5-Diethyl-2,2-dimethylheptane
 3,5-Diethyl-2,3-dimethylheptane
 3,5-Diethyl-2,4-dimethylheptane
 3,5-Diethyl-2,5-dimethylheptane
 3,5-Diethyl-2,6-dimethylheptane
 3,5-Diethyl-3,4-dimethylheptane
 3,5-Diethyl-3,5-dimethylheptane
 3,5-Diethyl-4,4-dimethylheptane
 4,4-Diethyl-2,2-dimethylheptane
 4,4-Diethyl-2,3-dimethylheptane
 4,4-Diethyl-2,5-dimethylheptane
 4,4-Diethyl-2,6-dimethylheptane
 4,4-Diethyl-3,3-dimethylheptane
 4,4-Diethyl-3,5-dimethylheptane
 4,5-Diethyl-2,2-dimethylheptane
 4,5-Diethyl-2,3-dimethylheptane
 4,5-Diethyl-2,4-dimethylheptane
 4,5-Diethyl-2,5-dimethylheptane
 4,5-Diethyl-3,3-dimethylheptane
 5,5-Diethyl-2,2-dimethylheptane
 5,5-Diethyl-2,3-dimethylheptane
 5,5-Diethyl-2,4-dimethylheptane

Triethyl
 3,3,4-Triethylheptane
 3,3,5-Triethylheptane
 3,4,4-Triethylheptane
 3,4,5-Triethylheptane

Trimethyl+Propyl

 2,2,3-Trimethyl-4-propylheptane
 2,2,4-Trimethyl-4-propylheptane
 2,2,5-Trimethyl-4-propylheptane
 2,2,6-Trimethyl-4-propylheptane
 2,3,3-Trimethyl-4-propylheptane
 2,3,4-Trimethyl-4-propylheptane
 2,3,5-Trimethyl-4-propylheptane
 2,3,6-Trimethyl-4-propylheptane
 2,4,5-Trimethyl-4-propylheptane
 2,4,6-Trimethyl-4-propylheptane
 2,5,5-Trimethyl-4-propylheptane
 3,3,4-Trimethyl-4-propylheptane
 3,3,5-Trimethyl-4-propylheptane
 3,4,5-Trimethyl-4-propylheptane
 2,2,3-Trimethyl-3-(1-methylethyl)heptane
 2,2,4-Trimethyl-3-(1-methylethyl)heptane
 2,2,5-Trimethyl-3-(1-methylethyl)heptane
 2,2,6-Trimethyl-3-(1-methylethyl)heptane
 2,3,4-Trimethyl-3-(1-methylethyl)heptane
 2,3,5-Trimethyl-3-(1-methylethyl)heptane
 2,3,6-Trimethyl-3-(1-methylethyl)heptane
 2,4,4-Trimethyl-3-(1-methylethyl)heptane
 2,4,5-Trimethyl-3-(1-methylethyl)heptane
 2,4,6-Trimethyl-3-(1-methylethyl)heptane
 2,5,5-Trimethyl-3-(1-methylethyl)heptane
 2,5,6-Trimethyl-3-(1-methylethyl)heptane
 2,2,3-Trimethyl-4-(1-methylethyl)heptane
 2,2,4-Trimethyl-4-(1-methylethyl)heptane
 2,2,5-Trimethyl-4-(1-methylethyl)heptane
 2,2,6-Trimethyl-4-(1-methylethyl)heptane
 2,3,3-Trimethyl-4-(1-methylethyl)heptane
 2,3,4-Trimethyl-4-(1-methylethyl)heptane
 2,3,5-Trimethyl-4-(1-methylethyl)heptane
 2,3,6-Trimethyl-4-(1-methylethyl)heptane
 2,4,5-Trimethyl-4-(1-methylethyl)heptane
 2,4,6-Trimethyl-4-(1-methylethyl)heptane
 2,5,5-Trimethyl-4-(1-methylethyl)heptane
 3,3,4-Trimethyl-4-(1-methylethyl)heptane
 3,3,5-Trimethyl-4-(1-methylethyl)heptane
 3,4,5-Trimethyl-4-(1-methylethyl)heptane
 2,2,6-Trimethyl-5-(1-methylethyl)heptane

Ethyl+Methyl+Propyl

 3-Ethyl-2-methyl-4-propylheptane
 3-Ethyl-3-methyl-4-propylheptane
 3-Ethyl-4-methyl-4-propylheptane
 3-Ethyl-5-methyl-4-propylheptane
 4-Ethyl-2-methyl-4-propylheptane
 4-Ethyl-3-methyl-4-propylheptane
 5-Ethyl-2-methyl-4-propylheptane
 3-Ethyl-2-methyl-3-(1-methylethyl)heptane
 4-Ethyl-2-methyl-3-(1-methylethyl)heptane
 5-Ethyl-2-methyl-3-(1-methylethyl)heptane
 3-Ethyl-2-methyl-4-(1-methylethyl)heptane
 3-Ethyl-3-methyl-4-(1-methylethyl)heptane
 3-Ethyl-4-methyl-4-(1-methylethyl)heptane
 3-Ethyl-5-methyl-4-(1-methylethyl)heptane
 4-Ethyl-2-methyl-4-(1-methylethyl)heptane
 4-Ethyl-3-methyl-4-(1-methylethyl)heptane
 5-Ethyl-2-methyl-4-(1-methylethyl)heptane

Dipropyl
 4,4-Dipropylheptane
 4-(1-Methylethyl)-4-propylheptane
 4,4-Bis(1-methylethyl)heptane

Dimethyl+Butyl

 2,5-Dimethyl-4-(1-methylpropyl)heptane
 2,6-Dimethyl-4-(1-methylpropyl)heptane
 3,5-Dimethyl-4-(1-methylpropyl)heptane
 2,6-Dimethyl-4-(2-methylpropyl)heptane
 3-(1,1-Dimethylethyl)-2,2-dimethylheptane
 4-(1,1-Dimethylethyl)-2,2-dimethylheptane
 4-(1,1-Dimethylethyl)-2,3-dimethylheptane
 4-(1,1-Dimethylethyl)-2,4-dimethylheptane
 4-(1,1-Dimethylethyl)-2,5-dimethylheptane
 4-(1,1-Dimethylethyl)-2,6-dimethylheptane
 4-(1,1-Dimethylethyl)-3,3-dimethylheptane
 4-(1,1-Dimethylethyl)-3,4-dimethylheptane
 4-(1,1-Dimethylethyl)-3,5-dimethylheptane

Ethyl+Butyl
 4-(1,1-Dimethylethyl)-3-ethylheptane
 4-(1,1-Dimethylethyl)-4-ethylheptane

With hexane backbone

Heptamethyl
 2,2,3,3,4,4,5-Heptamethylhexane
 2,2,3,3,4,5,5-Heptamethylhexane

Ethyl+Pentamethyl

 3-Ethyl-2,2,3,4,4-pentamethylhexane
 3-Ethyl-2,2,3,4,5-pentamethylhexane
 3-Ethyl-2,2,3,5,5-pentamethylhexane
 3-Ethyl-2,2,4,4,5-pentamethylhexane
 3-Ethyl-2,2,4,5,5-pentamethylhexane
 3-Ethyl-2,3,4,4,5-pentamethylhexane
 4-Ethyl-2,2,3,3,4-pentamethylhexane
 4-Ethyl-2,2,3,3,5-pentamethylhexane
 4-Ethyl-2,2,3,4,5-pentamethylhexane

Diethyl+Trimethyl

 3,3-Diethyl-2,2,4-trimethylhexane
 3,3-Diethyl-2,2,5-trimethylhexane
 3,3-Diethyl-2,4,4-trimethylhexane
 3,3-Diethyl-2,4,5-trimethylhexane
 3,4-Diethyl-2,2,3-trimethylhexane
 3,4-Diethyl-2,2,4-trimethylhexane
 3,4-Diethyl-2,2,5-trimethylhexane
 3,4-Diethyl-2,3,4-trimethylhexane
 3,4-Diethyl-2,3,5-trimethylhexane
 4,4-Diethyl-2,2,3-trimethylhexane
 4,4-Diethyl-2,2,5-trimethylhexane
 4,4-Diethyl-2,3,3-trimethylhexane

Triethyl+Methyl
 3,3,4-Triethyl-2-methylhexane
 3,3,4-Triethyl-4-methylhexane
 3,4,4-Triethyl-2-methylhexane

Tetramethyl+Propyl

 2,2,3,4-Tetramethyl-3-(1-methylethyl)hexane
 2,2,3,5-Tetramethyl-3-(1-methylethyl)hexane
 2,2,4,4-Tetramethyl-3-(1-methylethyl)hexane
 2,2,4,5-Tetramethyl-3-(1-methylethyl)hexane
 2,2,5,5-Tetramethyl-3-(1-methylethyl)hexane
 2,3,4,4-Tetramethyl-3-(1-methylethyl)hexane
 2,3,4,5-Tetramethyl-3-(1-methylethyl)hexane
 2,2,3,5-Tetramethyl-4-(1-methylethyl)hexane
 2,2,4,5-Tetramethyl-4-(1-methylethyl)hexane
 2,3,3,5-Tetramethyl-4-(1-methylethyl)hexane

Ethyl+Dimethyl+Propyl

 3-Ethyl-2,2-dimethyl-3-(1-methylethyl)hexane
 3-Ethyl-2,4-dimethyl-3-(1-methylethyl)hexane
 3-Ethyl-2,5-dimethyl-3-(1-methylethyl)hexane
 4-Ethyl-2,2-dimethyl-3-(1-methylethyl)hexane
 4-Ethyl-2,3-dimethyl-3-(1-methylethyl)hexane
 4-Ethyl-2,4-dimethyl-3-(1-methylethyl)hexane
 4-Ethyl-2,5-dimethyl-3-(1-methylethyl)hexane

Methyl+bis(Propyl)
 2-Methyl-3,3-bis(1-methylethyl)hexane

Butyl+Trimethyl
 3-(1,1-Dimethylethyl)-2,2,3-trimethylhexane
 3-(1,1-Dimethylethyl)-2,2,4-trimethylhexane
 3-(1,1-Dimethylethyl)-2,2,5-trimethylhexane

With pentane backbone

Diethyl+Tetramethyl
 3,3-Diethyl-2,2,4,4-tetramethylpentane

Pentamethyl+Propyl
 2,2,3,4,4-Pentamethyl-3-(1-methylethyl)pentane

Ethyl+Trimethyl+Propyl
 3-Ethyl-2,2,4-trimethyl-3-(1-methylethyl)pentane

Dimethyl+bis(Propyl)
 2,4-Dimethyl-3,3-bis(1-methylethyl)pentane

Butyl+Tetramethyl
 3-(1,1-Dimethylethyl)-2,2,4,4-tetramethylpentane

References 

Lists of isomers of alkanes
Isomerism
Hydrocarbons